KBNW (1340 AM) signed on the air August 29, 2008, broadcasting a News Talk Information format. Licensed to Bend, Oregon, United States, the station is owned by Summit Broadcasting Group, LLC (operated under a local marketing agreement by Horizon Broadcasting Group, LLC) and features programming from ABC News Radio, Compass Media Networks, Premiere Networks, and Westwood One, and is known as "News Radio KBNW".

Translator
KBNW also broadcasts on the following translator:

References

External links

News and talk radio stations in the United States
BNW
Radio stations established in 2008
2008 establishments in Oregon